Automatic box-opening technology refers to the process of automatically opening boxes on a conveyor or other "pass through" environment. The process was invented due to a gap in automation technology that exists in large distribution centers and warehouses. This trend has continued to develop as some manufacturing companies have gone overseas and leaving United States more as a mass distribution network rather than a manufacturer.

Conveyors, in-motion scales, sorting equipment, and high visibility software have contributed to automation of distribution center for years. However, the simple process of opening a box has safety issues and Automatic Box Cutters reduce high labor costs, processing over 500 boxes an hour. Such Automatic Box Cutting Technology is able to perform the work of up to 8 people by fully automating the box opening process, with only requiring manual interaction when changing cutting blades. This technology is able to increase overall efficiency through the entire packaging operation.

References

Industrial automation
Containers